Salmoneus is a genus of shrimps of the family Alpheidae. Understanding of the genus has grown rapidly, with only 19 known species before 2000, to over 40 species . Salmoneus contains the following species:

Salmoneus alpheophilus Anker & Marin, 2006
Salmoneus armatus Anker, 2010
Salmoneus arubae (Schmitt, 1936)
Salmoneus auroculatus Anker & Marin, 2006
Salmoneus babai Miyake & Miya, 1966
Salmoneus brevirostris (Edmondson, 1930)
Salmoneus brucei Komai, 2009
Salmoneus bruni Banner & Banner, 1966
Salmoneus caboverdensis Dworschak, Anker & Abed-Navandi, 2000
Salmoneus camaroncito Anker, 2010
Salmoneus carvachoi Anker, 2007
Salmoneus cavicolus Felder & Manning, 1986
Salmoneus colinorum De Grave, 2004
Salmoneus cristatus (Coutière, 1897)
Salmoneus degravei Anker, 2010
Salmoneus erasimorum Dworschak, Anker & Abed-Navandi, 2000
Salmoneus falcidactylus Anker & Marin, 2006
Salmoneus gracilipes Miya, 1972
Salmoneus hilarulus (De Man, 1910)
Salmoneus hispaniolensis Anker, 2010
Salmoneus jarli (Holthuis, 1951)
Salmoneus kekovae Grippa, 2004
Salmoneus komaii Anker, 2011
Salmoneus latirostris Coutière, 1896
Salmoneus mauiensis (Edmondson, 1930)
Salmoneus nhatrangensis Anker & Marin, 2006
Salmoneus ortmanni (Rankin, 1898)
Salmoneus paulayi Anker, 2011
Salmoneus poupini Anker, 2011
Salmoneus pusillus Anker & Marin, 2006
Salmoneus rocas Anker, 2007
Salmoneus rostratus Barnard, 1962
Salmoneus serratidigitus (Coutière, 1896)
Salmoneus seticheles Anker, 2003
Salmoneus setosus Manning & Chace, 1990
Salmoneus sibogae De Man, 1910
Salmoneus singaporensis Anker, 2003
Salmoneus sketi Fransen, 1991
Salmoneus tafaongae Banner & Banner, 1966
Salmoneus teres Manning & Chace, 1990
Salmoneus tricristatus Banner, 1959
Salmoneus wehrtmanni Anker, 2010

References

Alpheidae
Taxa named by Lipke Holthuis
Decapod genera